Henry Williams  was a Welsh politician who sat in the House of Commons  between 1654 and 1659.

Williams was the son of Robert Williams of Caehalfa and probably the grandson of Sir David Williams of Gwernyfed. He was High Sheriff of Breconshire in 1639 and High Sheriff of Radnorshire in 1649.

In 1654, Williams was elected Member of Parliament for Radnorshire for the First Protectorate Parliament. He was re-elected MP for Radnorshire in 1656 for the Second Protectorate Parliament and again in 1659 for the Third Protectorate Parliament. In 1662 Williams came to Cathedine in Breconshire and became High Sheriff of Breconshire again.

Williams married Mayzod Evans, widow of Leisan Evans of Gnoll, Neath and daughter of judge David Jenkins of Hensol Glamorgan.

References

Members of the Parliament of England (pre-1707) for constituencies in Wales
High Sheriffs of Brecknockshire
High Sheriffs of Radnorshire
Place of birth missing
Year of birth missing
Year of death missing
English MPs 1654–1655
English MPs 1656–1658
English MPs 1659